Parangimalai Assembly constituency is one of the 234 state legislative assembly constituencies in Tamil Nadu, a state in southern India is now defunct. It was in existence in 1967 and 1971 assembly elections. At that time, this constituency was represented only by the former chief minister of Tamil Nadu M. G. Ramachandran. Later it was merged with Alandur assembly constituency from 1977 assembly election.

List of members of legislative assembly

Election Results

Assembly election 1971

Assembly election 1967

References

External links
 

Former assembly constituencies of Tamil Nadu